The William Washington Seay House is a historic house in Wilson County, Tennessee, U.S.. It was built circa 1835 for William Washington Seay on a 600-acre tobacco plantation. It has been listed on the National Register of Historic Places since August 25, 1995.

References

Houses on the National Register of Historic Places in Tennessee
Houses completed in 1835
Houses in Wilson County, Tennessee
Plantations in Tennessee
National Register of Historic Places in Wilson County, Tennessee